Atriplex confertifolia, the shadscale or spiny saltbush, is a species of evergreen shrub in the family Amaranthaceae, which is native to the western United States and northern Mexico.

Description
Shadscale fruits and leaves provide important winter browse for domestic livestock and native herbivores. Compared to fourwing saltbush (Atriplex canescens), shadscale has shorter and wider leaves and the fruit does not have four wings (although it may have two wings in a "V" shape).

This species blooms from March to June.

Maximum osmotic pressure has been reported in Atriplex conf. where it is about 202.5 atm.

Distribution and habitat
Shadscale is a common, often dominant, shrub in the lowest and driest areas of the Great Basin. It prefers sandy, well-drained soils and it is tolerant of moderately saline conditions. Its habitats include alkaline desert valleys, hillsides, and bluffs.

References

External links
USDA Plants Profile for Atriplex confertifolia (shadscale)
Jepson Manual eFlora (TJM2) treatment of  Atriplex confertifolia
Missouri Botanical Garden: photo of herbarium isotype specimen of Atriplex subconferta (synonym of A. confertifolia) — collected in Wyoming (1911).

confertifolia
Flora of the Northwestern United States
Flora of the Southwestern United States
Flora of the South-Central United States
Flora of the California desert regions
Flora of the Colorado Plateau and Canyonlands region
Flora of the Great Basin
Plants described in 1845
Taxa named by John Torrey
Forages
Flora without expected TNC conservation status